Isaac Herbert Kempner (January 14, 1873 – August 1, 1967) was the founder of the Imperial Sugar Corporation and mayor of Galveston, Texas.

Early years
Kempner was born in 1873 in Cincinnati, Ohio. His father was a Polish Jewish immigrant and his mother was from the German Jewish Seinsheimer family in Cincinnati.  Kempner was the eldest of eight surviving children.  He studied at Washington and Lee University, but left just before graduation when his father died in 1894. Kempner returned to his family home in Galveston, Texas to assume control of the family business and care for his mother and seven siblings (who were as young as 2 years old at the time).

In 1902, Kempner married Henrietta Blum. They had 5 children together: Harris Leon Kempner, Isaac Herbert Kempner Jr., Cecile, Lyda, and Leonora.

Business ventures
In 1905, Kempner and fellow Galveston businessman William Lewis Moody Jr., established the American National Insurance Company;   However, by 1908, Kempner had sold his shares in the insurance company and with his family members, and a partner, William T. Eldridge, purchased a sugar plantation and mill in the area that would become the company town of Sugar Land.  Over the following years, they acquired additional assets and controlled the majority of the sugar industry in Texas.  These holdings were incorporated into the Imperial Sugar Company in 1924.  After Eldridge died, Kempner and his siblings acquired his partner's interest in the business.  In addition to his sugar and cotton holdings, Kempner was also involved in real estate and insurance businesses and, along with his siblings, held ownership in the United States National Bank in Galveston.

Kempner also contributed construction funds for the original 3.3 mile Galveston Seawall (which is currently 10 miles as of 2017).

Civic contributions
Kempner held various positions on the Galveston Cotton Exchange for the majority of his life.  He was Galveston's finance commissioner from 1901 to 1915 and its mayor from 1917 to 1919.  He is cited as one of the original proponents of the commission form of government.

Legacy
Sugar Land, the company town he helped found, has grown into the largest suburb of the Houston–Sugar Land–Baytown metropolitan area.  Kempner High School in Sugar Land is named in his honor. An historical district of Galveston, TX – the Kempner Park neighborhood, is bounded by Broadway, 23rd Street, Seawall Boulevard, and 39th Street. The entire stretch of 22nd Street in Galveston is named in his honor. After the Storm of 1900, he also was instrumental in financing the construction of the Galveston Seawall. Kempner, along with his siblings, was instrumental in the founding of the Harris & Eliza Kempner Fund, a charitable foundation dedicated to the health and well-being of Galveston families as well as the improvement of Galveston.

His granddaughter, Lyda Ann Thomas, served as the Mayor of Galveston from 2004 to 2010.

See also
 History of the Jews in Galveston, Texas

References

External links
 
 
 

1873 births
1967 deaths
Jews and Judaism in Galveston, Texas
Jewish American people in Texas politics
Jewish mayors of places in the United States
American financiers
American bankers
American philanthropists
Mayors of Galveston, Texas
Politicians from Cincinnati